"Showgirl" is a song recorded by British-Bangladeshi singer Mumzy Stranger from his 2010 mixtape No Stranger to This. It was released as a single on 1 November 2009 by Tiffin Beats Records.

References

External links

2009 songs
2009 singles
Mumzy Stranger songs